GRIN2B-related neurodevelopmental disorder is a rare neurodevelopmental disorder which is characterized by developmental delays and intellectual disabilities of variable degrees, muscle tone anomalies, feeding difficulties, and behavioral problems.

Signs and symptoms 

The following list comprises most of the symptoms people with GRIN2B show:
 Intellectual disability (mild to severe)
 Developmental delay (mild to severe)
 Hypotonia
 Epilepsy
 Autism spectrum disorder
 Autistic-like behavior
 Microcephaly
 Hyperactivity
 Stereotypy
 Spasticity
 Feeding difficulties

Less common symptoms include:
 Visual impairment
 Dystonia
 Dyskinesia
 Other choreiform movement disorder

Causes 

This condition is caused by mutations in the GRIN2B gene, located in chromosome 12.

This gene makes instructions into how to make a protein called GluN2B, a type of NMDA receptor, which is found in brain neurons during ante-natal brain development. It is involved in correct brain development and function, regulating memory, synaptic plasticity and the ability of learning.

Epidemiology 

Around 100 cases have been described in medical literature.

References 

Neurodevelopmental disorders
Rare genetic syndromes
Syndromes with intellectual disability